Flute sonata in B minor may refer to:

 Flute sonata in B minor (HWV 367b)
 Flute sonata in B minor (HWV 376)